A transom is the vertical reinforcement which strengthens the stern of a boat. This flat termination of the stern is typically above the waterline.

The term was used as far back as Middle English in the 1300s, having come from Latin transversus (transverse) via Old French traversain (set crosswise).

The stern of a boat is typically vertical. It can be raked such that there is an overhang above the water, as at the bow. A reverse transom is angled from the waterline forwards.

Transoms can be used to support a rudder, outboard motor, or as a swimming and access platform.

Gallery

References 

Sailboat components
Watercraft components